Potomac is a station on the Red Line route of Pittsburgh Regional Transit's light rail network. It is located in Dormont, Pennsylvania. The station serves as a small commuter stop, featuring 22 parking spaces. It is located in a densely populated residential area and is designed to provide the primary access route for area residents to Downtown Pittsburgh.

References

External links 

Port Authority T Stations Listings

Port Authority of Allegheny County stations
Railway stations in the United States opened in 1987
Red Line (Pittsburgh)